Mihály Bodosi (13 December 1909 – 21 March 2005) was a Hungarian athlete. He competed in the men's high jump at the 1936 Summer Olympics.

References

External links
 

1909 births
2005 deaths
People from Baraolt
Székely people
Athletes (track and field) at the 1936 Summer Olympics
Hungarian male high jumpers
Olympic athletes of Hungary